The blacknose dace is either of two ray-finned fish species:
 Eastern blacknose dace, Rhinichthys atratulus
 Western blacknose dace, Rhinichthys obtusus